Ignacio Cobos Vidal (born 12 June 1966 in Madrid) is a former field hockey player from Spain, who won the silver medal with the men's national team at the 1996 Summer Olympics in Atlanta, Georgia.

References
Spanish Olympic Committee

External links
 

1966 births
Living people
Spanish male field hockey players
Olympic field hockey players of Spain
Field hockey players at the 1984 Summer Olympics
Field hockey players at the 1996 Summer Olympics
Olympic silver medalists for Spain
Field hockey players from Madrid
Olympic medalists in field hockey
Medalists at the 1996 Summer Olympics
20th-century Spanish people